Antz is a 1998 American computer-animated adventure comedy film produced by DreamWorks Animation (in its debut film) and Pacific Data Images and released by DreamWorks Pictures. It was directed by Eric Darnell and Tim Johnson (in their feature directorial debuts) from a screenplay by Todd Alcott, Chris Weitz, and Paul Weitz. The film features the voices of Woody Allen, Sharon Stone, Jennifer Lopez, Sylvester Stallone, Christopher Walken, Dan Aykroyd, Anne Bancroft, Danny Glover and Gene Hackman. Some of the main characters share facial similarities with the actors who voice them. The film involves an anxious worker ant, Z (Allen), who falls in love with Princess Bala (Stone). When the treacherous scheming of the arrogant officer General Mandible (Hackman) threaten to wipe out the entire worker population, Z must save the ant colony from the flooded tunnel and strives to make social inroads.

Development began in 1988 when Walt Disney Feature Animation pitched a film called Army Ants, about a pacifist worker ant teaching lessons of independent thinking to his militaristic colony. Meanwhile, Jeffrey Katzenberg had left the company in a feud with CEO Michael Eisner over the vacant president position after the death of Frank Wells. Katzenberg would later go on to help co-found DreamWorks with Steven Spielberg and David Geffen, and the three planned to rival Disney with the company's new animation division. The film began production in May 1996, after production had already commenced on The Prince of Egypt (1998). DreamWorks had contracted Pacific Data Images (PDI) in Palo Alto, California to begin working on computer-animated films to rival Pixar's features. Harry Gregson-Williams and John Powell composed the music for the film, making their first animated film. During its production, a public feud erupted between Jeffrey Katzenberg of DreamWorks, and Steve Jobs and John Lasseter of Pixar, due to the production of their similar film A Bug's Life, which was released a month later. This is only worsened when Disney refused to avoid competition with DreamWorks' intended first animated release, The Prince of Egypt.

Antz premiered at the Toronto International Film Festival on September 19, 1998, and was released theatrically in the United States on October 2, 1998. It grossed $171.8 million worldwide on a budget of $42–105 million and received positive reviews, with critics praising the voice cast, animation, humor, and its appeal towards adults.

Plot
Z is an anxious worker ant who chafes at conformity and the fact that everyone, even his psychiatrist, reminds him he is insignificant. While at the local bar one night, Z falls in love with Princess Bala when she visits the bar to escape her suffocating royal life. The ant colony declares war on an encroaching termite colony, and soldiers are sent to engage the invaders. To see Bala again, Z exchanges places with his soldier friend, Weaver, and joins the army, where he befriends staff sergeant Barbatus. The ants are unaware that General Mandible, the army's leader and Bala's fiancee, is secretly sending the soldiers loyal to the Queen to die so he can stage a coup d'état. In the battle, everyone except Z is killed by much-larger acid-shooting termite defenders. Before dying, Barbatus tells Z to think for himself instead of blindly following orders. Meanwhile, Weaver joins the digging crew and falls in love with Z's co-worker, Azteca.

Z returns home and is mistakenly hailed as a war hero. Secretly unsatisfied, Mandible congratulates him and introduces him to the Queen. There, Z meets Bala, who recognizes him as a worker. Z panics and pretends to take Bala hostage, causing him and Bala to fall out of the anthill via a garbage chute. Now a fugitive, Z decides to search for Insectopia, a legendary insect paradise. Bala attempts to return to the colony, but quickly rejoins Z after encountering a praying mantis. Z's act of individuality inspires the workers and some soldier ants, halting productivity. To gain control, Mandible publicly portrays Z as a self-centered war criminal, promotes the glory of conformity and promises the workers rewards for completing a "Mega Tunnel" he designed. However, Mandible's second-in-command, a flying ant named Cutter, begins to doubt Mandible's constant reassurances that he's acting "for the good of the colony".

Z and Bala come upon a human picnic, which they mistake for Insectopia. They are baffled by the wrappings on the food, but Muffy and Chip, a married couple of liberal wasps, condescendingly befriend them and try to help break the wrappers. They are disrupted by the humans, who kill Muffy with a fly swatter and attempt to squish them with a shoe. Z rescues Bala from the sneaker, and the two ants at last find Insectopia, a trash can overfilled with decaying food. Bala begins to reciprocate Z's feelings. Meanwhile, after interrogating Weaver, Mandible learns that Z is looking for Insectopia and sends Cutter to find it. That night, Cutter arrives at Insectopia and forcibly flies Bala back to the colony while Z is away. Seeing Z's desperation at finding Bala gone, a drunken Chip, mourning over Muffy's death, generously flies him back to the colony. When Z arrives, he encounters soldiers who forcibly direct him toward the Mega Tunnel. Along the way, he finds Bala held captive in Mandible's office. After he frees her, they both discover that Mandible's Mega Tunnel leads straight to the puddle next to Insectopia, which Mandible will use to drown the Queen Ant and the workers at the opening ceremony. Bala warns the Queen while Z attempts to stop the workers in time, but fails. Z and Bala unify the Queen and workers into building a ladder of themselves towards the surface as the water rises.

Meanwhile, Mandible gathers the soldiers on the surface and gloats he has created a new colony, where only the strong survive. When the worker ants break through the surface, Cutter betrays Mandible and rescues the worker ants "for the good of the colony". Enraged, Mandible attempts to tackle Cutter, but Z intervenes and takes the blow. He and Mandible fall back into the flooded tunnel, with Mandible striking a root and dying on impact. Z is nearly drowned, but is rescued by Cutter and resuscitated by Bala. Z is praised for his heroism, and he and Bala become a couple. Together, they rebuild the colony, and Z narrates that he is finally content with his place in the world. The camera then zooms out to show the anthill in Central Park in New York City.

Voice cast 

 Woody Allen as Z Marion-4195 "Z", an idealistic, but anxious, worker ant.
 Gene Hackman as General Mandible, the sarcastic, unscrupulous and arrogant general officer of the ant military.
 Sharon Stone as Princess Bala, the Queen Ant's daughter, Mandible's fiancée, and Z's love interest.
 Sylvester Stallone as Corporal Weaver, a brave soldier ant and Z's best friend who becomes Azteca's boyfriend.
 Jennifer Lopez as Azteca, another friend of Z's and a worker ant who becomes Weaver's girlfriend.
 Christopher Walken as Colonel Cutter, a flying ant that serves as Mandible's patient and empathetic adviser who becomes disillusioned by the general's actions.
 Danny Glover as Staff Sergeant Barbatus, a soldier ant who befriends Z during the fight against the termites.
 Anne Bancroft as the Queen Ant, Princess Bala's mother and ruler of the ants.
 Dan Aykroyd as Chip, a wasp whom Z befriends.
 Grant Shaud as the Foreman, the head of the worker ants.
 John Mahoney as Grebs, a drunk ant scout who talked about Insectopia.
 Jane Curtin as Muffin "Muffy" the Wasp, Chip's wife.
 Paul Mazursky as Z's Psychiatrist.
 Jerry Sroka as the Bartender, the unnamed bartender of the bar that Z and Weaver frequent.
 Jim Cummings and April Winchell as additional voices

The cast features several actors from movies Allen wrote, starred in and directed, including Stone (Stardust Memories), Stallone (Bananas), Hackman (Another Woman), and Walken (Annie Hall). Aykroyd later co-starred in Allen's The Curse of the Jade Scorpion.

Production

Development and writing 
In 1988, Walt Disney Feature Animation was pitched a movie called Army Ants, about a pacifist worker ant teaching lessons of independent thinking to his militaristic colony. Years later, Jeffrey Katzenberg, then chairman of Disney's film division, had left the company in a feud with CEO Michael Eisner over the vacant president position after the death of Frank Wells. Katzenberg would later go on to help co-found DreamWorks with Steven Spielberg and David Geffen, and the three planned to rival Disney with the company's new animation division. Katzenberg at DreamWorks began developing projects he tried to pursue or suggested while at Disney, including The Prince of Egypt, a collaboration with Aardman Animations which resulted in Chicken Run, Sinbad, and Army Ants. Also many ideas for the film were barrowed from a scrapped PDI film pitch for a computer animated film from 1991 called Bugs: Lights Out about microscopic robots that takes apart machinery.

Production began in May 1996, after production had already commenced on The Prince of Egypt. DreamWorks had contracted Pacific Data Images (PDI) in Palo Alto, California to begin working on computer-animated films to rival Pixar's features. Woody Allen was cast in the lead role of Z, and much of Allen's trademark humor is present within the film. Allen himself made some uncredited rewrites to the script, to make the dialogue better fit his style of comedic timing. An altered line from one of his early directed films, Everything You Always Wanted to Know About Sex* (*But Were Afraid to Ask) was included – "I was going to include you in my most erotic fantasies..."

Feud between DreamWorks and Pixar 
After DreamWorks' acquisition of PDI, Pixar director John Lasseter, Steve Jobs, and others at Pixar were dismayed to learn from the trade papers that PDI's first project at DreamWorks would be another ant film, to be called Antz. By this time, Pixar's project, then similarly called Bugs, was well known within the animation community. In general, both Antz and A Bug's Life center on a young male ant, a drone with oddball tendencies, who struggles to win a princess's hand by saving their society. Lasseter and Jobs believed that the idea was stolen by Katzenberg. Katzenberg had stayed in touch with Lasseter after the acrimonious Disney split, often calling to check up. In October 1995, when Lasseter was overseeing postproduction work on Toy Story at the Universal Studios lot, where DreamWorks was also located, Lasseter and Andrew Stanton visited Katzenberg and they discussed their plans for Bugs in detail. Lasseter had high hopes for Toy Story, and he was telling friends throughout the tight-knit computer-animation business to get cracking on their own films. "If this hits, it's going to be like space movies after Star Wars" for computer-animation studios, he told various friends. "I should have been wary," Lasseter later recalled. "Jeffrey kept asking questions about when it would be released."

When the trades indicated production on Antz, Lasseter, feeling betrayed, called Katzenberg and asked him bluntly if it were true, Katzenberg confirming it. Katzenberg recalled Antz came from a 1991 story pitch by Tim Johnson that was related to Katzenberg in October 1994. Another source gives Nina Jacobson, one of Katzenberg's executives, as the person responsible for the Antz pitch. Lasseter refused to believe Katzenberg's story. Lasseter recalled that Katzenberg was under the impression that Disney was "out to get him" and that he realized that he was just cannon fodder in Katzenberg's fight with Disney. Eisner had decided not to pay Katzenberg his contract-required bonus, convincing Disney's board not to give him anything. Lasseter grimly relayed the news of Antz to Pixar employees but kept morale high. Privately, Lasseter told other executives that he and Stanton felt terribly let down.

Competition with Disney 
At the time, the current Disney studio executives were starting a bitter competitive rivalry with Jeffrey Katzenberg and his new DreamWorks films. In 1995, Katzenberg announced The Prince of Egypt to debut in November 1998 as DreamWorks' first animated release. A year later, Disney scheduled Bugs to open on the same weekend, which infuriated Katzenberg. Katzenberg invited Disney executives to DreamWorks to negotiate a release date change for Bugs, but the company refused to budge. DreamWorks pushed Prince of Egypt to the Christmas season and the studio had decided not to begin full marketing for Antz until after Prince of Egypt was released. Disney afterward announced release dates for films that were going to compete with The Prince of Egypt, and both studios had to compete with Paramount Pictures, which was releasing The Rugrats Movie in November, based on Nickelodeon's animated series Rugrats. Katzenberg suddenly moved the opening of Antz from March 1999 to October 1998, in order to successfully beat A Bug's Life into cinemas.

David Price writes in his 2008 book The Pixar Touch that a rumor, "never confirmed", was that Katzenberg had given PDI "rich financial incentives to induce them to whatever it would take to have Antz ready first, despite Pixar's head start". Jobs furiously called Katzenberg to explain that there was nothing he could do to convince Disney to change the date. Katzenberg said to him that Jobs himself had taught him how to conduct similar business long ago, explaining that Jobs had come to Pixar's rescue from near bankruptcy by making the deal for Toy Story with Disney. He flat-out told Jobs that he had enough power with Disney to convince them to change specific plans on their films. Lasseter also claimed Katzenberg had phoned him with a final proposition to delay Antz if Disney and Pixar changed the date of A Bug's Life, but Katzenberg vehemently denied this. Jobs believed it was "a blatant extortion attempt".

Release fallout and comparisons 
As the release dates for both films approached, Disney executives concluded that Pixar should keep quiet on Antz and the feud concerning DreamWorks. Regardless, Lasseter publicly dismissed Antz as a "schlock version" of A Bug's Life; however, Lasseter later admitted that he never saw the film. Lasseter claimed that if DreamWorks and PDI had made the film about anything other than insects, he would have closed Pixar for the day so the entire company could go see it. Jobs and Katzenberg would not back down and the rivaling ant films provoked a press frenzy. "The bad guys rarely win," Jobs told the Los Angeles Times. In response, DreamWorks' head of marketing Terry Press suggested, "Steve Jobs should take a pill." Tensions would remain high between Jobs and Katzenberg for many years after the release of both films. According to Jobs, years later, Katzenberg approached him after the opening of Shrek, and insisted that he had never heard the pitch for A Bug's Life, reasoning that his settlement with Disney would have given him a share of the profits if that were so. In the end, Pixar and PDI employees kept up the old friendships that had arisen from working in computer animation for years before feature films.

The final product of both films are generally perceived to contrast one another in tone and certain plot points. Antz in the end seemed to be more geared towards older audiences, featuring moderate violence, mild sexual innuendoes, and profanity, as well as social and political satire. A Bug's Life was more family-friendly and lighthearted in tone and story. The two films especially differ in their artistic look: Antz played off more realistic aspects of ants and how they relate to other bugs, like termites and wasps, while A Bug's Life offered a more fanciful look at insects to better suit its story. PopMatters journalist J.C. Maçek III compared the two films and wrote, "The feud deepened with both teams making accusations and excuses and a release date war ensued. While Antz beat A Bug's Life to the big screen by two months, the latter film significantly out grossed its predecessor. Rip off or not, Antz'''s critical response has proven to be almost exactly as positive as what A Bug's Life has enjoyed."

 Music 

The original music for the film was composed by Harry Gregson-Williams and John Powell. The soundtrack was released on November 3, 1998 by Angel Records.

Initially, Jeffrey Katzenberg wanted Hans Zimmer to compose the music, but he was too busy with The Prince of Egypt among other projects. Instead, Zimmer suggested two composers from his studio — either Harry Gregson-Williams or John Powell — both of whom had already collaborated on Egypt.

 Release 
 Theatrical 
On December 23, 1997, a teaser trailer for Antz, depicting the opening scene with Z in an ant psychiatrist office, first played in theaters in front of select prints of As Good as It Gets. Anticipation was generally high with adult moviegoers rather than families and children. Antz premiered at the 1998 Toronto Internation film Film Festival on September 19, 1998, and enter wide release on October 2, 1998.

 Home media Antz was released on VHS and DIVX on February 9, 1999, and on DVD on March 23, becoming the first feature-length CGI-animated film to be available on DVD. The original release used a 35mm print of the film, rather than an encoded version from the original files. A special edition version was released on February 14, 2003. The film was released on Blu-ray on October 16, 2018 for the film's 20th anniversary.

 Reception 
 Box office 
The film topped the box office in its opening weekend, earning $17,195,160 for a $7,021 average from 2,449 theatres. It surpassed Stargate to have the highest October opening weekend. This record would last for two years until it was beaten by Meet the Parents in 2000. In its second weekend, the film held the top spot again, with a slippage of only 14% to $14.7 million for a $5,230 average and expanding to 2,813 sites. It held well also in its third weekend, slipping only 24% to $11.2 million and finishing in third place, for a $3,863 average from 2,903 theatres. The film's widest release was 2,929 theatres, and closed on February 18, 1999. The film altogether picked up $90,757,863 domestically, but failed to outgross the competition with A Bug's Life. The film picked up an additional $81 million in other territories for a worldwide total of $171.8 million.

According to DreamWorks, the film's budget was about $42 million, while the numbers $60 million and $105 million were also reported. According to Los Angeles Times, the first figure was doubted by the film industry, considering that other computer-animated films at the time cost twice of that amount, and that the budget did not include start-up costs of PDI.

 Critical response 
On review aggregator Rotten Tomatoes, the film has an approval rating of 92% based on 92 reviews and an average rating of 7.60/10. The site's critical consensus reads, "Featuring a stellar voice cast, technically dazzling animation, and loads of good humor, Antz should delight both children and adults." Metacritic gave the film a score of 72 out of 100 based on 26 critics, indicating "generally favorable reviews". Audiences polled by CinemaScore gave the film an average grade of "B+" on an A+ to F scale.

Roger Ebert praised the film, saying that it is "sharp and funny". The variety of themes, interesting visuals, and voice acting were each aspects of the film that were praised. Ebert's partner, Gene Siskel, greatly enjoyed the film and preferred it over A Bug's Life. Siskel later ranked it No. 7 on his picks of the Best Films of 1998.

 Accolades 

 Other media 

 Video games 

 Cancelled sequel 
A direct-to-video sequel was in development at DreamWorks at the time of the release of Antz''. Like the first film, it was planned to be produced by Pacific Data Images, and was also considered for theatrical release. By early 1999, when DreamWorks closed its television animation unit and merged the direct-to-video unit with the feature animation, the sequel was still planned, but eventually the project was cancelled.

See also 
List of films that depict class struggle

References

External links 

 
 
 
 
 

 
1998 films
1998 computer-animated films
1998 comedy films
1990s adventure comedy films
1990s American animated films
1990s children's comedy films
1990s fantasy comedy films
American adventure comedy films
American children's animated adventure films
American children's animated fantasy films
American computer-animated films
American fantasy adventure films
Animated films about insects
DreamWorks Animation animated films
DreamWorks Pictures films
1990s English-language films
Fictional ants
Fictional Hymenoptera
Films directed by Eric Darnell
Films directed by Tim Johnson
Films scored by Harry Gregson-Williams
Films scored by John Powell
Films produced by Aron Warner
Films produced by Brad Lewis
Animated films set in New York City
Psychotherapy in fiction
Films with screenplays by Chris Weitz
Films with screenplays by Paul Weitz
Films with screenplays by Todd Alcott
1990s fantasy adventure films
1998 directorial debut films
Films about coups d'état
Films about ants
Films involved in plagiarism controversies